Piano dell'Acqua is a southern Italian village and hamlet (frazione) of Chiaramonte Gulfi, a municipality in the Province of Ragusa, Sicily. In 2011 it had a population of 3,172.

History
The name means water-plain, and until the late 1970s, beside the stream that crosses the village, there was an ancient washbasin in local limestone.

Geography
The village lies north of its province, close to the borders with the Province of Catania. It is 10 km north of Chiaramonte Gulfi and 17 km south of Licodia Eubea.

Economy
The local economy is mainly based on agriculture. Vineyards and olive trees dominate the landscape.

References

External links

Frazioni of the Province of Ragusa